Izzat (English: Respect) is a 1991 Bollywood action film directed by Ashok Gaikwad, starring Jackie Shroff, Sangeeta Bijlani, Shakti Kapoor, Ishrat Ali, Sadashiv Amrapurkar, Urvashi Dholakia, Gulshan Grover, Goga Kapoor, Raza Murad, Paresh Rawal, Amjad Khan, Dan Dhanoa, Rakesh Bedi, Yunus Parvez, Mohan Choti, Bharat Kapoor, Birbal, Harish Patel, Brando Bakshi and Wonder Dog-Brownie.

Cast
Jackie Shroff as Inspector Siddhant 
Sangeeta Bijlani as Surya (Thakur's Younger Daughter) 
Shakti Kapoor as Constable Kale Khan
Raza Murad as DSP Sheetal Prasad 
Gulshan Grover as Ganpat (Thakur's Son) 
Paresh Rawal as Minister Kishanlal Pandey
Sadashiv Amrapurkar as Thakur
Aruna Irani as Thakur's Wife
Goga Kapoor as Constable Ramchandra
Urvashi Dholakia as Anu  
Beena Banerjee as Mrs. Pandey (Thakur's Elder Daughter) 
Amjad Khan as D.C.P. Shamsher Khan 
Ishrat Ali as Inspector Jagatpal
Tinnu Anand as Judge Mishra (Voice-over)
Dan Dhanoa as Thakur's Son 
Rakesh Bedi as Villager
Yunus Parvez as Villager 
Mohan Choti as Villager 
Bharat Kapoor as Inspector 
Harish Patel as Constable Sultan 
Brando Bakshi as Thakur's Son
Wonder Dog-Brownie as Master
Master Rinku as Junior Shiva

Soundtrack

External links
 

Indian action films
1990s Hindi-language films
Films scored by Anu Malik
Films directed by Ashok Gaikwad
1991 action films